Oumuamua is the first interstellar object detected passing through the Solar System. Formally designated 1I/2017 U1, it was discovered by Robert Weryk using the Pan-STARRS telescope at Haleakalā Observatory, Hawaii, on 19 October 2017, approximately 40 days after it passed its closest point to the Sun on 9 September.

It has a red color, similar to objects in the outer Solar System. Despite its close approach to the Sun, it showed no signs of having a coma. It has exhibited nongravitational acceleration, potentially due to outgassing or a push from solar radiation pressure. It has a rotation rate similar to that of Solar System asteroids, but many valid models permit it to be more elongated than all but a few other natural bodies. Its light curve, assuming little systematic error, presents its motion as "tumbling" rather than "spinning", and moving sufficiently fast relative to the Sun that it is likely of an extrasolar origin. Extrapolated and without further deceleration, its path cannot be captured into a solar orbit, so it will eventually leave the Solar System and continue into interstellar space. Its planetary system of origin and age are unknown.

Oumuamua would be remarkable for its extrasolar origin, high obliqueness, and observed acceleration without an apparent coma. By July 2019, most astronomers concluded that it was a natural object, but its exact characterization is contentious given the limited observation window. While an unconsolidated object (rubble pile) would require Oumuamua to be of a density similar to rocky asteroids, a small amount of internal strength similar to icy comets would allow it to have a relatively low density. Proposed explanations of its origin include the remnant of a disintegrated rogue comet, or a piece of an exoplanet rich in nitrogen ice, similar to Pluto. A number of astronomers have suggested that it could be a product of extraterrestrial technology, but there is insufficient evidence to support any hypotheses "despite all [its] strangeness".  In January 2022, researchers proposed Project Lyra, where a spacecraft launched from Earth could catch up to 'Oumuamua in 26 years for closer studies.

Naming 

As the first known object of its type, Oumuamua presented a unique case for the International Astronomical Union, which assigns designations for astronomical objects. Originally classified as comet C/2017 U1, it was later reclassified as asteroid A/2017 U1 due to the absence of a coma. Once it was unambiguously identified as coming from outside the Solar System, a new designation was created: I, for Interstellar object. As the first object so identified, Oumuamua was designated 1I, with rules for the eligibility of objects for I-numbers and the names to be assigned to these interstellar objects yet to be codified. The object may be called 1I; 1I/2017 U1; 1I/Oumuamua; or 1I/2017 U1 (Oumuamua).

The name comes , and reflects the way the object is like a scout or messenger sent from the distant past to reach out to humanity. It roughly translates to 'first distant messenger'. The first character diacritic is a Hawaiian okina, not an apostrophe, and is pronounced as a glottal stop; the Pan-STARRS team chose the name in consultation with Ka‘iu Kimura and Larry Kimura of the University of Hawaii at Hilo.

Before the official name was decided, Rama was suggested, the name given to an alien spacecraft discovered under similar circumstances in the 1973 science fiction novel Rendezvous with Rama by Arthur C. Clarke.

Observations 
Observations and conclusions concerning Oumuamua's trajectory were primarily obtained with data from the Pan-STARRS1 Telescope, part of the Spaceguard Survey, and the Canada–France–Hawaii Telescope (CFHT), and its composition and shape from the Very Large Telescope and the Gemini South telescope in Chile, and the Keck II telescope in Hawaii. These were collected by Karen J. Meech, Robert Weryk and their colleagues and published in Nature on 20 November 2017. After the announcement, the space-based telescopes Hubble and Spitzer joined in the observations.

Oumuamua is small and not very luminous. It was not seen in STEREO HI-1A observations near its perihelion on 9 September 2017, limiting its brightness to approximately 13.5 mag. By the end of October, it had already faded to about apparent magnitude 23, and in mid-December 2017, it was too faint and fast moving to be studied by even the largest ground-based telescopes.

Oumuamua was compared to the fictional alien spacecraft Rama due to its interstellar origin. Adding to the coincidence, both the real and the fictional objects are unusually elongated. Oumuamua has a reddish hue and unsteady brightness, which are typical of asteroids.

The SETI Institute's radio telescope, the Allen Telescope Array, examined Oumuamua, but detected no unusual radio emissions. More detailed observations, using the Breakthrough Listen hardware and the Green Bank Telescope, were performed; the data were searched for narrowband signals and none were found. Given the close proximity to this interstellar object, limits were placed to putative transmitters with the extremely low effective isotropically radiated power of 0.08 watts.

Trajectory 

Oumuamua appears to have come from roughly the direction of Vega in the constellation Lyra. Its incoming direction of motion is 6° from the solar apex (the direction of the Sun's movement relative to local stars), which is the most likely direction from which objects coming from outside the Solar System should approach. On 26 October, two precovery observations from the Catalina Sky Survey were found dated 14 and 17 October. A two-week observation arc had verified a strongly hyperbolic trajectory.

By mid-November, astronomers were certain that it was an interstellar object. Based on observations spanning 80 days, Oumuamua's orbital eccentricity is 1.20, the highest ever observed until 2I/Borisov was discovered in August 2019.  An eccentricity exceeding 1.0 means an object exceeds the Sun's escape velocity, is not bound to the Solar System and may escape to interstellar space. While an eccentricity slightly above 1.0 can be obtained by encounters with planets, as happened with the previous record holder, C/1980 E1, Oumuamua's eccentricity is so high that it could not have been obtained through an encounter with any of the planets in the Solar System. Even undiscovered planets in the Solar System, if any should exist, could not account for Oumuamua's trajectory, nor boost its speed to the observed value. For these reasons, it can only be of interstellar origin.

Oumuamua entered the Solar System from north of the plane of the ecliptic. It is now heading away from the Sun towards Pegasus towards a vanishing point 66° from the direction of its approach.

On 16 October it moved back north of the ecliptic plane and passed beyond the orbit of Mars on 1 November. It passed beyond Jupiter's orbit in May 2018, beyond Saturn's orbit in January 2019, and beyond Neptune's in 2022. As it leaves the Solar System it will be approximately right ascension 23'51" and declination +24°45', in Pegasus. It will continue to slow down until it reaches a speed of  relative to the Sun, the same speed it had before its approach to the Solar System.

Non-gravitational acceleration 
On 27 June 2018, astronomers reported a non-gravitational acceleration to Oumuamua's trajectory, potentially consistent with a push from solar radiation pressure. The resulting change in velocity during the period when it was near its closest approach to the Sun summed to about 17 meters per second. Initial speculation as to the cause of this acceleration pointed to the comet-like outgassing, whereby volatile substances inside the object evaporate as the Sun heats its surface. Although no such tail of gasses was observed following the object, researchers estimated that enough outgassing may have increased the object's speed without the gases being detectable. A critical re-assessment of the outgassing hypothesis argued that, instead of the observed stability of Oumuamua's spin, outgassing would have caused its spin to rapidly change due to its elongated shape, resulting in the object tearing apart.

Indications of origin 
Accounting for Vega's proper motion, it would have taken Oumuamua 600,000 years to reach the Solar System from Vega. But as a nearby star, Vega was not in the same part of the sky at that time. This interstellar speed is very close to the mean motion of material in the Milky Way in the neighborhood of the Sun, also known as the local standard of rest (LSR), and especially close to the mean motion of a relatively close group of red dwarf stars. This velocity profile also indicates an extrasolar origin, but appears to rule out the closest dozen stars. In fact, the closeness of Oumuamua's velocity to the local standard of rest might mean that it has circulated the Milky Way several times and thus may have originated from an entirely different part of the galaxy.

It is unknown how long the object has been traveling among the stars. The Solar System is likely the first planetary system that Oumuamua has closely encountered since being ejected from its birth star system, potentially several billion years ago. It has been speculated that the object may have been ejected from a stellar system in one of the local kinematic associations of young stars (specifically, Carina or Columba) within a range of about 100 parsecs, some 45 million years ago. The Carina and Columba associations are now very far in the sky from the Lyra constellation, the direction from which Oumuamua came when it entered the Solar System. Others have speculated that it was ejected from a white dwarf system and that its volatiles were lost when its parent star became a red giant. A more recent study (August 2018) using Gaia Data Release 2 has updated the possible past close encounters and has identified four stars that Oumuamua passed relatively close to and at moderately low velocities in the past few million years.
This study also identifies future close encounters of Oumuamua on its outgoing trajectory from the Sun.

In September 2018, astronomers described several possible home star systems from which Oumuamua may have originated.

In April 2020, astronomers presented a new possible scenario for the object's origin. According to one hypothesis, Oumuamua could be a fragment from a tidally disrupted planet. If true, this would make Oumuamua a rare object, of a type much less abundant than most extrasolar "dusty-snowball" comets or asteroids. However, this scenario leads to cigar-shaped objects whereas Oumuamua's lightcurve favors a disc-like shape.

In May 2020, it was proposed that the object was the first observed member of a class of small H2-ice-rich bodies that form at temperatures near 3 K in the cores of giant molecular clouds. The non-gravitational acceleration and high aspect ratio shape of Oumuamua might be explainable on this basis. However, it was later calculated that hydrogen icebergs cannot survive their journey through interstellar space.

Classification 

Initially, Oumuamua was announced as comet C/2017 U1 (PANSTARRS) based on a strongly hyperbolic trajectory. In an attempt to confirm any cometary activity, very deep stacked images were taken at the Very Large Telescope later the same day, but the object showed no presence of a coma. Accordingly, the object was renamed A/2017 U1, becoming the first comet ever to be re-designated as an asteroid. Once it was identified as an interstellar object, it was designated 1I/2017 U1, the first member of a new class of objects. It also indicates that the object must have formed within the frost line of its parent stellar system or have been in the inner region of that stellar system long enough for all near-surface ice to sublimate, as may be the case with damocloids. It is difficult to say which scenario is more likely due to the chaotic nature of small body dynamics, although if it formed in a similar manner to Solar System objects, its spectrum indicates that the latter scenario is true. Any meteoric activity from Oumuamua would have been expected to occur on 18 October 2017 coming from the constellation Sextans, but no activity was detected by the Canadian Meteor Orbit Radar.

On 27 June 2018, astronomers reported that Oumuamua was thought to be a mildly active comet, and not an asteroid, as previously thought. This was determined by measuring a non-gravitational boost to Oumuamua's acceleration, consistent with comet outgassing. However, studies submitted in October 2018 suggest that the object is neither an asteroid nor a comet, although the object could be a remnant of a disintegrated interstellar comet (or exocomet), as suggested by astronomer Zdenek Sekanina.

Appearance, shape and composition 
Spectra from the Hale Telescope on 25 October showed red color resembling comet nuclei or Trojans. Higher signal to noise spectra recorded by the  William Herschel Telescope later that day showed that the object was featureless, and colored red like Kuiper belt objects. Spectra obtained with the  Very Large Telescope the following night showed that behavior continued into near-infrared wavelengths. Its spectrum is similar to that of D-type asteroids.

Oumuamua is not rotating around its principal axis, and its motion may be a form of tumbling. Most likely, Oumuamua was set tumbling by a collision in its system of origin, and remains tumbling since the time scale for dissipation of this motion is very long, at least a billion years.

The large variations on the light curves indicate that Oumuamua may be anything from a highly elongated cigar-like object, comparable to or greater than the most elongated Solar System objects, to an extremely flat object, a pancake or oblate spheroid. However, the size and shape have not been directly observed as Oumuamua appears as nothing more than a point source of light even in the most powerful telescopes. Neither its albedo nor its triaxial ellipsoid shape is known. If cigar-shaped, the longest-to-shortest axis ratio could be 5:1 or greater. According to astronomer David Jewitt, the object is physically unremarkable except for its highly elongated shape. Bannister et al. have suggested that it could also be a contact binary, although this may not be compatible with its rapid rotation. One speculation regarding its shape is that it is a result of a violent event (such as a collision or stellar explosion) that caused its ejection from its system of origin. JPL News reported that Oumuamua "is up to one-quarter mile (400 meters) long and highly-elongated — perhaps 10 times as long as it is wide".

A 2019 paper finds the best models as either a cigar-shape, 1:8 aspect ratio, or disc-shape, 1:6 aspect ratio, with the disc more likely since its rotation does not require a specific orientation to see the range of brightnesses observed. Monte Carlo simulations based on the available orbit determination suggest that the equatorial obliquity of Oumuamua could be about 93 degrees, if it has a very prolate or cigar-like shape, or close to 16 degrees, if it is very oblate or disk-like. A 2021 paper found that the extreme shape was likely a result of recent evaporation, and that when the object entered the Solar System it likely had an unremarkable 2:1 aspect ratio. The authors calculated that a month after perihelion, that Oumuamua had lost 92% of the mass it had upon entering the Solar System.

Light curve observations suggest the object may be composed of dense metal-rich rock that has been reddened by millions of years of exposure to cosmic rays. It is thought that its surface contains tholins, which are irradiated organic compounds that are more common in objects in the outer Solar System and can help determine the age of the surface. This possibility is inferred from spectroscopic characterization and its reddish color, and from the expected effects of interstellar radiation. Despite the lack of any cometary coma when it approached the Sun, it may still contain internal ice, hidden by "an insulating mantle produced by long-term cosmic ray exposure".

In November 2019, some astronomers noted that Oumuamua may be a "cosmic dust bunny", due to its "very lightweight and 'fluffy' conglomerate of dust and ice grains".  
In August 2020, astronomers reported that ʻOumuamua is not likely to have been composed of frozen hydrogen, which had been proposed earlier; the compositional nature of the object continues to be unknown.

Radio measurements 
In December 2017, astronomer Avi Loeb of Harvard University, an adviser to the Breakthrough Listen Project, cited Oumuamua's unusually elongated shape as one of the reasons why the Green Bank Telescope in West Virginia would listen for radio emissions from it to see if there were any unexpected signs that it might be of artificial origin, although earlier limited observations by other radio telescopes such as the SETI Institute's Allen Telescope Array had produced no such results. On 13 December 2017, the Green Bank Telescope observed the object for six hours across four bands of radio frequency. No radio signals from Oumuamua were detected in this very limited scanning range, but more observations were planned.

Discussion

Nitrogen ice theory 
Outgassing of nitrogen ice (N2) could explain why no outgassing was detected. Nitrogen ice the size of 'Oumuamua could survive for 500 million years in the interstellar medium and would reflect two-thirds of the Sun's light. This explanation has been further supported in March 2021 when scientists presented a theory based on nitrogen ice, and further concluded that Oumuamua may be a piece of an exoplanet similar to the dwarf planet Pluto, an exo-Pluto as noted, from beyond our solar system. This theory has been criticized by Loeb. In November 2021, theoretical studies by Siraj and Loeb hypothesized that 'Oumuamua was not a nitrogen iceberg.

Hydrogen ice theory
It has been proposed that ʻOumuamua contains a significant amount of hydrogen ice. This would point to it originating from the core of an interstellar molecular cloud, where conditions for the formation of this material might exist. The Sun's heat would cause the hydrogen to sublime, which would in turn propel the body. The hydrogen coma formed by this process would be difficult to detect from Earth-based telescopes, as the atmosphere blocks those wavelengths. Regular water-ice comets undergo this as well, however to a much lesser extent and with a visible coma. This may explain the significant non-gravitational acceleration that ʻOumuamua underwent without showing signs of coma formation. Significant mass loss caused by the sublimation would also explain the unusual cigar-like shape, comparable to how a bar of soap becomes more elongated as it is used up.

However, it was later shown that hydrogen icebergs cannot form out of small grains and that, to not evaporate during their journey in interstellar space, they would had to be formed about 40 millions years ago, in the close neighborhood of the solar system.

Hypothetical space missions 

The Initiative for Interstellar Studies (i4is) launched Project Lyra to assess the feasibility of a mission to Oumuamua. Several options for sending a spacecraft to Oumuamua within a time-frame of 5 to 25 years were suggested. Different mission durations and their velocity requirements were explored with respect to the launch date, assuming direct impulsive transfer to the intercept trajectory.

The Space Launch System (also being looked at for "interstellar precursor missions") would be even more capable.

More advanced options of using solar, laser electric, and laser sail propulsion, based on Breakthrough Starshot technology, have also been considered. The challenge is to get to the interstellar object in a reasonable amount of time (and so at a reasonable distance from Earth), and yet be able to gain useful scientific information. To do this, decelerating the spacecraft at Oumuamua would be "highly desirable, due to the minimal science return from a hyper-velocity encounter". If the investigative craft goes too fast, it would not be able to get into orbit or land on the object and would fly past it. The authors conclude that, although challenging, an encounter mission would be feasible using near-term technology. Seligman and Laughlin adopt a complementary approach to the Lyra study but also conclude that such missions, though challenging to mount, are both feasible and scientifically attractive.

Technosignature hypothesis 
On 26 October 2018, Loeb and his postdoc Shmuel Bialy submitted a paper exploring the possibility of Oumuamua being an artificial thin solar sail accelerated by solar radiation pressure, in an effort to help explain the object's comet-like non-gravitational acceleration. Other scientists have stated that the available evidence is insufficient to consider such a premise, and that a tumbling solar sail would not be able to accelerate. In response, Loeb wrote an article detailing six anomalous properties of Oumuamua that make it unusual, unlike any comets or asteroids seen before. A subsequent report on observations by the Spitzer Space Telescope set a tight limit on cometary outgassing of any carbon-based molecules and indicated that Oumuamua is at least ten times more shiny than a typical comet. The solar sail technosignature hypothesis is considered unlikely by many experts owing to available simpler explanations that align with the expected characteristics of interstellar asteroids and comets.

Other interstellar objects

2I/Borisov was discovered on 30 August 2019, and was soon confirmed to be an interstellar comet. Arriving from the direction of Cassiopeia, the object arrived at perihelion (closest point to the Sun) on 8 December 2019.

Oumuamua is possibly the third interstellar object known; the first and second being purported interstellar meteors CNEOS 2014-01-08 and CNEOS 2017-03-09 that impacted Earth in 2014 and 2017, respectively.

See also 
 2I/Borisov an interstellar comet and the second interstellar interloper discovered
 C/1980 E1 (Bowell) – the most eccentric comet known in the Solar System with an eccentricity of 1.057
 514107 Kaepaokaawela, an asteroid of  possible interstellar origin
 C/2017 U7, a non-interstellar hyperbolic comet discovered 10 days after Oumuamua, announced in March 2018
 C/2018 C2, another non-interstellar hyperbolic comet, announced in March 2018
 Extraterrestrial: The First Sign of Intelligent Life Beyond Earth, a 2021 book by Avi Loeb describing the ʻOumuamua technosignature hypothesis
 Rendezvous with Rama, a 1973 Arthur C. Clarke science-fiction novel about intercepting a large cylindrical spacecraft transiting the Solar System

Notes

References

External links 

 
 Where is 'Oumuamua in the sky: The Sky Live
 Talk about A/2017 U1 from 31 October 2017. SETI Institute at Facebook Live.
  
  Proposal #13249
 
 
 "A piece of an extrasolar Pluto may have passed through our cosmic neighborhood, a new study suggests.", article by Dennis Overbye, New York Times, Updated March 29, 2021
 
 Science fiction story about Oumuamua by astronomer Andrew Fraknoi
 Interactive 3D gravity simulation of Oumuamua's Solar System flyby 

20171018

Hyperbolic asteroids
Interstellar objects
Milky Way
Near-Earth objects in 2017